Máximo González Mereira (born July 20, 1983, in Tandil) is an Argentine professional tennis player. His career-high singles ranking is World No. 58, achieved in July 2009 and his career-high doubles ranking is World No. 22 achieved on 22 April 2019.

Career

Singles

Early career through 2006 
In singles play, González won two Futures events in the second half of 2004.  He won four more Futures events in 2005 before finally finding success on the Challenger circuit with two consecutive semi-final appearances and a quarterfinal, improving his ranking to No. 206 in November 2005.

2007: ATP singles debut, Challenger circuit success
His success waned in early 2007, and by the end of July, his ranking had slipped out of the 250 to No. 267 in singles, despite qualifying in late July for his first ATP-level event, and then again a second time the following week.

In August, he built on that recent success, winning his first-ever Challenger title in Spain.  The following week in Italy, he won his second Challenger title, beating former world #9 Mariano Puerta in the final.  He beat Puerta a second time a few days later, but lost in the second round that week.  The following week, still in Italy, he won his 3rd Challenger singles title, as well as his 7th doubles title.  In the first week in September in Romania, he won his 4th Challenger in five weeks.  In seven weeks, he went 27–3 in singles matches, including wins over 14 top-200 players, to improve his ranking to a No. 125 on September 10, 2007.

2008–2014
González reached the semifinals of Umag in 2008 and Kitzbühel in 2014.

Doubles

2008–2014: US Open semifinal, French Open quarterfinal
He reached his first Grand Slam semifinal at the 2008 US Open (tennis) partnering with fellow Argentinian Juan Mónaco where they lost to seventh seeded and eventual runners-up Lukáš Dlouhý and Leander Paes. Six year later, he reached his second Grand Slam quarterfinal at the 2014 French Open also with Monaco.

2021: New partnership, Wimbledon semifinal, Three titles and one final, Career-high ranking in top 25
In 2021 González won two clay titles with new partner Simone Bolelli at the Chile Open (tennis) and Emilia-Romagna Open in Parma and one grass title at the first edition of the Mallorca Championships after the walkover from the wildcard pair Novak Djokovic/Carlos Gómez-Herrera and reached one other ATP final. Their most successful run was to the 2021 Wimbledon Championships semifinals where the pair was defeated by fourth seeded pair and eventual runners-up Marcel Granollers and Horacio Zeballos. As a result of this run he returned to the top 30 in the doubles rankings at World No. 28 on 12 July 2021 and later to top 25 on 13 September 2021.

González finished the year ranked World No. 22 in doubles, his career-high ranking.

2022-2023: Tenth clay doubles title 
He reached the semifinals at the 2022 Estoril Open with Swede André Göransson defeating Pablo Cuevas and João Sousa. They reached the final after defeating fourth seeds Raven Klaasen/ Ben McLachlan.

He won his tenth clay title at the 2023 Córdoba Open with compatriot Andrés Molteni. It was the third for Molteni at this tournament.

ATP career finals

Doubles: 20 (14 titles, 6 runner-ups)

ATP Challenger and ITF Futures finals

Singles: 33 (24–9)

Doubles: 69 (37–32)

Performance timelines

Singles

Doubles

Notes

References

External links 

 Maximo Gonzalez Recent Match Results
 Gonzalez World Ranking History

1983 births
Living people
Argentine male tennis players
Argentine people of Spanish descent
People from Tandil
Tennis players at the 2016 Summer Olympics
Olympic tennis players of Argentina
Sportspeople from Buenos Aires Province